Bob Mair is an American composer/producer who began his career as a touring and studio bass guitar player. Throughout the years, Mair has recorded or performed with artists Hank Williams Jr., Chuck Berry, Lesley Gore, Bo Diddley, Wayne Kramer, Nels Cline, David Becker and more. Mair currently owns Black Toast Music, a Los Angeles based independent music publisher that creates and licenses music for the use in film, television, radio, advertisement, internet, as well as all other media.

Discography 

Return of Citizen Wayne (2002) (w. Wayne Kramer)
Destroy All Nels Cline (2001) (w. Nels Cline)
Highbridge Park (2000) (w. Ken Wiley)
Love (1999) (w. John Boswell)
Malarchitecture (1998) (w. Lean-To)
Sad (1998) (w. Nels Cline Trio)
At the Beginning (1997) (w. Stacy Sullivan)
Mgm Album (1997) (w. Debbie Gravitte)
Chicago... And All That Jazz (1997) (w. Brad Ellis)
Citizen Wayne (1997) (w. Wayne Kramer)
Mixed Signals (1996) (w. Belle Stilwill)
Lee Lessack (1996) (w. Lee Lessack)
Chest (1996) (w. Nels Cline Trio)
Mind Body & Soul (1996) (w. Barebones)
Once Upon a Time in the Cinema (1996) (w. Ennio Morricone)
Ground (1995) (w. Nels Cline Trio)
George and Ira Gershwin: A Musical Celebration (1994) (w. George Gershwin)
Pangea (1994) (w. Kalani)
Suffocating City (1992) (w. Submedia)
Submedia (1990) (w. Submedia)
America: The Way I See It (1990) (w. Hank Williams Jr.)
Dorian's Legacy (1989) (w. Spencer Brewer)
Third Time Around (1990) (w. David Becker)

Filmography 

Into the Blue 2: The Reef (2009) Soundtrack (writer: "Keep it Comin'")
Whisper (2007) Soundtrack (writer: "Rancho Shuffle", "Hey Now")
Dead Silence (2007) Soundtrack (writer/performer: "Let It Go")
Reno 911!: Miami (2007) Soundtrack (writer: "What You Lookin' At")
See No Evil (2006) Soundtrack (writer: "Army of One")
Stuart Little 3: Call of the Wild (2005) Soundtrack (writer: "Hey Now", "Big Man On The Block", "Where It's At")
The Ice Harvest (2005) Soundtrack (writer: "Every Night and Every Day")
Duck (2005) Soundtrack (2005) (writer: "Bang Them Bones")
Jiminy Glick in Lalawood (2004) Soundtrack (writer: "Samba Wamba", "Bathtub Gin", "Sabato Tarde", "Champagne Kisses")
After School Special (2003) Soundtrack (writer: "Lollipop")
Local Boys (2002) Soundtrack (writer: "Back Against the Wall", "The Game Is Over")
Mojave Moon (1996) Soundtrack (writer: "Poor Ol' Joe")

External links 
 "About", Black Toast Music

Year of birth missing (living people)
Living people
American composers